The Cameroonian Highlands forests, also known as the Cameroon Highlands forests, are a montane tropical moist broadleaf forest ecoregion located on the range of mountains that runs inland from the Gulf of Guinea and forms the border between Cameroon and Nigeria. This is an area of forest and grassland which has become more populous as land is cleared for agriculture.

Geography
The highlands extend roughly southwest–northeast. In the southwest the ecoregion includes the Rumpi Hills, Bakossi Mountains, Mount Nlonako, Mount Kupe, and Mount Manengouba. It extends northeast towards the Mambila Plateau, and north to the Bamenda Highlands. It continues northeast along the western flank of the Adamawa Plateau to Tchabal Gangdaba. Northern outliers include the Mambilla Plateau to the northeast, Nigeria's Obudu Plateau to the northwest, the Alantika Mountains and Hosséré Vokré to the north, and two small outliers east of Tchabal Gandaba on the Adamawa Plateau. 

The ecoregion lies above 900 meters elevation, and is surrounded at lower elevations by the Cross–Sanaga–Bioko coastal forests at the southern end of the range, and by Guinean forest–savanna mosaic along the central and northern ends of the range. The Cameroon Highlands form the boundary between the Guinean and Northern Congolian forest–savanna mosaic ecoregions. The highest peak within the ecoregion is Mount Oku. Mount Cameroon is highest mountain in the chain, but its high-elevation forests are designated a separate ecoregion.

Climate
Mean maximum temperatures are below 20°C due to the effects of altitude, and are cooler than the surrounding lowlands. Average annual rainfall ranges from around 4,000 mm near the coast to 1,800 mm or less further inland. The highlands are an important source of water for both Nigeria and Cameroon.

Flora
The vegetation varies with elevation. Above  elevation are distinct montane forests and patches of montane grassland, bamboo forest, and subalpine grasslands and shrublands. The ecoregion is characterized by the presence of afromontane species, which have an archipelago-like distribution across the highlands of Africa. Typical afromontane species are Nuxia congesta, Podocarpus milanjianus, Prunus africana, Rapanea melanophloeos, and Syzygium guineense bamendae.

Fauna
The ecoregion is home to a number of endemic species, along with several more that are also found in the nearby Mount Cameroon and Bioko montane forests ecoregion.

Seven species of birds are strictly endemic: the Bamenda apalis (Apalis bamendae), Bangwa forest warbler (Bradypterus bangwaensis), white-throated mountain-babbler (Kupeornis gilberti), banded wattle-eye (Platysteira laticincta), Bannerman's weaver (Ploceus bannermani), Mount Kupe bush-shrike (Telophorus kupeensis) and Bannerman's turaco (Tauraco bannermani), which is a cultural icon for the Kom people who live in the area. Fourteen species are endemic to the Cameroon Highlands forests and Mt. Cameroon: Andropadus montanus, Phyllastrephus poliocephalus, Laniarius atroflavus, Malaconotus gladiator, Cossypha isabellae and the subspecies Cisticola chubbi discolor (sometimes considered a separate species C. discolor). Nine more montane endemic species are shared with Mt. Cameroon and Bioko: Psalidoprocne fuliginosa, Andropadus tephrolaemus, Phyllastrephus poensis, Phylloscopus herberti, Urolais epichlora, Poliolais lopezi, Nectarinia oritis, Nectarinia ursulae, and Nesocharis shelleyi.

Eleven small mammal species are endemic to the ecoregion: Eisentraut's striped mouse (Hybomys eisentrauti), the Mount Oku hylomyscus (Hylomyscus grandis), Mount Oku rat (Lamottemys okuensis), Mittendorf's striped grass mouse (Lemniscomys mittendorfi), Dieterlen's brush-furred mouse (Lophuromys dieterleni) and Eisentraut's brush-furred rat (L. eisentrauti), Oku mouse shrew (Myosorex okuensis,) Rumpi mouse shrew (M. rumpii), western vlei rat (Otomys occidentalis), Hartwig's soft-furred mouse (Praomys hartwigi), and Bioko forest shrew (Sylvisorex isabellae).

The ecoregion is home to several endangered primates, including the Cross River gorilla (Gorilla gorilla diehli), an endemic subspecies of western gorilla, mainland drill (Mandrillus leucophaeus leucophaeus), Preuss's red colobus (Pilocolobus preussi), chimpanzee (Pan troglodytes) and several species of guenon including Preuss's monkey (Cercopithecus preussi).

Forty species of amphibians are endemic to the ecoregion: Petropedetes parkeri, Petropedetes perreti, Phrynobatrachus cricogaster, Phrynobatrachus steindachneri, Phrynobatrachus werneri, Phrynobatrachus species, Phrynodon species, Cardioglossa melanogaster, Cardioglossa oreas, Cardioglossa pulchra, Cardioglossa schioetzi, Cardioglossa trifasciata, Cardioglossa venusta, Astylosternus nganhanus, Astylosternus perreti, Astylosternus montanus, Astylosternus rheophilus, Leptodactylodon axillaris, Leptodactylodon bicolor, Leptodactylodon boulengeri, Leptodactylodon erythrogaster, Leptodactylodon mertensi, Leptodactylodon polyacanthus, Leptodactylodon perreti, Afrixalus lacteus, Hyperolius ademetzi, Hyperolius riggenbachi, Leptopelis nordequatorialis, Xenopus amieti, Xenopus species, Bufo villiersi, Werneria bambutensis, Werneria tandyi, Wolterstorffina mirei.

The following reptiles are also considered more or less endemic: Atractaspis coalescens, Pfeffer's chameleon (Trioceros pfefferi), four-horned chameleon (Trioceros quadricornis), Leptosiaphos ianthinoxantha, Angel's five-toed skink (Lacertaspis lepesmei), and the gecko Cnemaspis alantika.

Urban areas and settlements
In Cameroon the mountains are quite heavily populated and used for farming and grazing; much of this ecoregion lies in the Northwest and Adamawa Regions. Towns include Bamenda, capital of the Northwest and base for visiting the mountains including Oku, the Kilum-Ijim Forest and Lake Nyos. In Nigeria the ecoregion is located mainly on the Mambila Plateau, an area of agricultural and grazing land in Taraba State.

Conservation and threats
The forest is continually being cleared for firewood, timber and to create farmland, and many of the mountains have lost significant amounts of forest cover. There is very little formal environmental protection.

Protected areas
6.9% of the ecoregion is in protected areas. Protected areas include Gashaka-Gumti National Park, Korup National Park, Bayang-Mbo Wildlife Sanctuary, Santchou Faunal Reserve, Gangoro Forest Reserve, Mai Samari Forest Reserve, Ngel-Nyaki Forest Reserve, River Nwum Forest Reserve, Kakara Forest Reserve, and Nguroje Forest Reserve.

References

External links
 
 Mission for the preservation of drill monkeys

 
Afromontane ecoregions
Afrotropical ecoregions
Ecoregions of Cameroon
Ecoregions of Nigeria
Forests of Cameroon
Tropical and subtropical moist broadleaf forests